Béna Fanès is a railway station in Enveitg, Occitanie, France. The station is on the Ligne de Cerdagne. The line is a narrow gauge line at 1,000 mm (3 ft 3 3⁄8 in) and has a third rail pickup at 750 V DC (3rd Rail). The station is served by TER Occitanie (local) trains (known as Train Jaune) operated by the SNCF.

Train services
The following services currently call at Béna Fanès:
local service (TER Occitanie) Latour-de-Carol-Enveitg–Font-Romeu–Villefranche-Vernet-les-Bains

References

Railway stations in Pyrénées-Orientales